Kreuzeck may refer to:

 Kreuzeck group, a mountain range of the Central Eastern Alps
 Kreuzeck (Allgäu Alps), a mountain in the Allgäu Alps of Bavaria, Germany
 Kreuzeck (Wetterstein), a mountain in the Wetterstein range of Bavaria, Germany